Lahore Jinnah Bus Terminal (or Thokar Niaz Beg Bus Terminal), is one of three major bus terminals in Lahore, Punjab, Pakistan. It is located in Thokar Niaz Beg at the interchange between the M2 motorway and N5 national highway (Multan Road). Thokar Niaz Beg serves as the major entry and exit point from south Lahore.

See also
 Lahore Badami Bagh Bus Terminal (Badami Bagh)
 Lahore City Bus Terminal (Yateem Khana)

References

Bus stations in Lahore
Transport in Lahore
Buildings and structures in Lahore